GMS Racing is an American professional stock car racing team that competes in the NASCAR Craftsman Truck Series, fielding three Chevrolet Silverado trucks: the No. 23 for Grant Enfinger, the No. 24 for Rajah Caruth, and the No. 43 for Daniel Dye.

GMS Racing previously competed in the NASCAR Xfinity Series from 2016 to 2019 and the ARCA Menards Series from 2011 to 2015 and again from 2019 to 2022. The team's driver development program, Drivers Edge Development, is operated in conjunction with JR Motorsports. 

Owner Maurice J. Gallagher Jr. is the chairman and CEO of the Allegiant Travel Company, which intermittently sponsors the team through its Allegiant Air brand.

History
Before the formation of his team, Maurice Gallagher was previously involved in NASCAR with local Las Vegas driver and friend Spencer Clark's team when it competed in the NASCAR Busch East Series and Busch Series until Clark's unexpected death in 2006.

GMS Racing, then known as Gallagher Motorsports, was formed in 2011 when they entered ARCA competition. They then expanded their operations into the Camping World Truck Series in 2013, and then to the Xfinity Series in 2016. The team was initially based in Charlotte, North Carolina, in the former BAM Racing shop. The team later moved to another shop, and BK Racing moved into their old shop.

For the 2014 season, the team acquired the assets of Richard Childress Racing's truck series program, and entered a technical alliance with the organization. In 2015, former crew chief Mike Beam became competition director, while RCR and manufacturer Chevrolet increased their technical support. In addition, the team relocated from Charlotte to Statesville, North Carolina near the Statesville Regional Airport. This was the former facility of Evernham Motorsports and later Richard Petty Motorsports, which had been unoccupied since 2010. GMS also began using the number font formerly used by Braun Racing and Turner Scott Motorsports. As of 2016, the No. 21 team in the Xfinity Series uses the same number font as Wood Brothers Racing, alternating with the number style of the rest of the team. In early 2017, the team formed an alliance with Halmar Friesen Racing. This alliance was expanded in August of that year.

In early 2019, it was announced that GMS Racing had started a Chevrolet development program, Drivers Edge Development, with JR Motorsports. Drivers in the program would race in GMS Racing's NASCAR K&N Pro Series, ARCA Menards Series, and NASCAR Camping World Truck Series teams, as well as JR Motorpsorts's Late Model and NASCAR Xfinity Series teams. They would be mentored by Mardy Lindley (GMS crew chief) and Josh Berry (JR Motorsports Late Model driver).  GMS Racing drivers John Hunter Nemechek, Sheldon Creed, and Sam Mayer were among the inaugural members of the program.

On December 1, 2021, Gallagher purchased a majority interest in the former Richard Petty Motorsports for 19 million. The deal included both of RPM's charters; the No. 43 continued to operate with its charter while the second charter - which was leased to Rick Ware Racing for the No. 51 from 2019 to 2021 - was transferred to a second car for the team, the No. 42. Following the purchase, the team was renamed to Petty GMS Motorsports. However, GMS continued to operate independent of Petty GMS and Richard Petty did not buy into GMS' Truck and ARCA teams.

Xfinity Series

Car No. 21 history
Part-time (2016)
On February 4, 2016, GMS announced that they would field a part-time Chevrolet Camaro for Spencer Gallagher for 13 races starting at Phoenix. The car number would be 21. Gallagher finished 23rd in that race. Gallagher ran a total of seven races in the No. 21 car in 2016, with a best finish of eighth in the Daytona July race.

Car No. 21 results

Car No. 23 history
Spencer Gallagher (2017–2018)

On December 1, 2016, GMS announced that they will field a full-time No. 23 (The 21 was occupied by Richard Childress Racing driver Daniel Hemric) Chevrolet Camaro for Spencer Gallagher. Gallagher had a disappointing rookie season, with just only one top 10 at Richmond and eight DNF's in the 2017 season.  The organization scored its first NXS victory with Gallagher in spring 2018 at  Talladega Superspeedway. On May 2, 2018, four days after his first win, NASCAR announced that Gallagher was suspended indefinitely for a substance-abuse violation.  Johnny Sauter was announced as a substitute driver. Brennan Poole tested the car at Charlotte, leading some to believe that he would drive in the Charlotte race later that month. However, it was later announced that Cup Series driver Chase Elliott would be in the car for that race, as well as the races at Pocono, Chicagoland, Daytona, and Bristol. Alex Bowman was later announced as the driver of the 23 at Michigan and Kentucky while Justin Haley drove the 23 at Iowa in his XFINITY Series debut. Casey Roderick made his return to the series driving the 23 at the July Iowa race and it was also announced later that night that A. J. Allmendinger would pilot the 23 at Watkins Glen the following weekend.

On August 4, 2018, GMS Racing announced that NASCAR Hall of Famer and 1988 NASCAR Winston Cup Series champion Bill Elliott will come out of retirement to drive the No. 23 at the Road America race on August 25.

John Hunter Nemechek (2019)
John Hunter Nemechek came over to the 23 car from Chip Ganassi Racing to run the full season in the No. 23 in 2019. Despite only leading 14 laps, Nemechek qualified for the Chase and performed well, finishing seventh in points, the best for GMS. After the season, he announced that he would be leaving to join Front Row Motorsports in the Cup Series, leaving the car open for 2020. Nemechek would total five top 5s and 19 top 10s in his one year at GMS.

Car No. 23 results

Car No. 24 history
Justin Haley (2018)
Although it was rumored for many months Brennan Poole and Brett Moffitt would drive the car full-time sharing the car in 2018, the car didn't return till later in the year renumbered to the No. 24. with Justin Haley driving the car in 2018 at Daytona in July and Watkins Glen in August. At the Daytona race, Haley was running third on the last lap off of turn 4 who then made an elevator move to pass both Kyle Larson and Elliott Sadler to cross the line first, though it was determined that Haley put two wheels below the line while passing both even though he had plenty of room to pass. They stripped Haley of the win to Kyle Larson and Haley was placed as the last car on the lead lap. Many thought this would be Haley's ride for 2019 but he moved on to Kaulig Racing instead.

Car No. 24 results

Car No. 96 history
Ben Kennedy (2017)
On April 17, 2017, it was announced that Ben Kennedy would pilot a new second Xfinity entry for GMS in twelve races, beginning with the May race at Charlotte Motor Speedway. Jeff Stankiewicz, who was Kennedy's crew chief for his 2016 Chase run in the trucks, was also crew chief for the No. 96. Brett Moffitt drove the 96 at the second Iowa race picking up an 11th-place finish. The No. 96 team has not run since Darlington Raceway and has withdrawn from some races after that with no sponsor listed.

Car No. 96 results

Closure
On November 21, 2019, GMS Racing announced the closure of their Xfinity Series program to focus on their Truck Series and ARCA Menards Series teams.

Craftsman Truck Series

Truck No. 2 history

Cody Coughlin (2018)
On January 16, 2018, it was announced that Cody Coughlin would drive the No. 2 JEGS Chevrolet for the 2018 NASCAR Camping World Truck Series.
On September 24, 2018, Coughlin was released due to sponsorship issues. Spencer Gallagher drove the Talladega race where he finished 25th. Sheldon Creed was announced as the driver for the rest of the season.

Sheldon Creed (2018–2021)
Sheldon Creed took over the No. 2 truck full-time in 2019, after running the last four races in 2018. On July 22, 2019, GMS Racing announced that Jeff Stankiewicz would replace Doug Randolph as the crew chief of the No. 2. On August 6, 2019, NASCAR suspended Stankiewicz, truck chief Austin Pollak, and engineer Jonathan Stewart for three races through September 10 after the No. 2 truck was discovered to have a ballast container violation during post-race inspection at Eldora. Darren Fraley served as interim crew chief during Stankiewicz's suspension. Creed finished 11th in points with four top-5 finishes and 11 top-10 finishes.

Creed had a breakout season in 2020. He got his first win in a rain-shortened Buckle Up in Your Truck 225, and his first non-rain-shortened win in the BrakeBest Select 159 five weeks later. Creed eventually won the championship, with five wins, nine top-fives, and thirteen top tens.

Creed remained in the No. 2 for the 2021 NASCAR Camping World Truck Series.  At Darlington Raceway, crashes in the last stage eliminated the leaders and Creed took the lead on the final restart, preventing Rhodes from passing him as he won his first race of the season.  Creed entered the playoffs as the fifth seed and won the first two races at Gateway and Darlington. A crash at Las Vegas dropped Creed outside of the top four in points that would advance to the Championship Round. Although he finished ninth in the Round of 8's elimination race at Martinsville, he was four points short of making the final round. Creed moved to Richard Childress Racing No. 2 car in the Xfinity Series in 2022 and the 2 truck was shut down.

Truck No. 2 results

Truck No. 21 history

Spencer Gallagher (2013)
The 21 made 5 attempts in 2013 with Spencer Gallagher, qualifying for 3 races. Gallagher finished 22nd at Kansas, 20th at Texas, and 32nd at the season finale at Homestead.

Joey Coulter (2014)
In January 2014, it was announced that 23-year-old Joey Coulter would drive the 21 Silverado full-time for GMS after driving Toyotas in 2013 for Kyle Busch Motorsports and Joe Gibbs Racing. GMS also announced a technical alliance with RCR, the team Coulter drove for in 2011 and 2012 and won at Pocono. Jeff Stankiewicz was announced as the crew chief. Coulter earned three top 5s and ten top 10s to finish 7th in points.

Part-time (2015)
Due to a lack of sponsorship, Joey Coulter did not return to the driver's seat in 2015. Instead, he assumed the post of team relationships coordinator for the team. At Las Vegas in October, Brennan Poole made his series debut in the 21 Truck with sponsorship from DC Solar.

Johnny Sauter (2016–2018)
Johnny Sauter drove full-time in 2016 in the No. 21 Chevrolet Silverado with crew chief Marcus Richmond. Sauter won in his debut with GMS at Daytona. However, in the next 3 races, he finished 28th, 32nd, and 16th respectively. Sauter won at a fall Martinsville race to clinch a final four championship race at Homestead. In the next week, Sauter won at a fall Texas race, his third victory of the season. Sauter clinched his first career Truck Series championship at Homestead by virtue of his 3rd-place finish in the event.

Sauter returned to the team in 2017. After qualifying for the Championship 4 round in 2017 and 2018, but losing to Christopher Bell and Brett Moffitt in each year respectively, Sauter was released from the team due to lack of sponsorship, to make room for Brett Moffitt in 2019.

Part Time (2019)
It was later announced that Sam Mayer would drive the 21 on a part-time schedule towards the end of the 2019 season.

Zane Smith (2020–2021)
On November 19, 2019, it was announced that Zane Smith would drive a fourth full-time truck for the 2020 season, which was later revealed to be the No. 21. Smith had an outstanding rookie season with two wins, seven top fives, thirteen top tens, and second-place points finish.

Smith returned to the team in 2021. Smith made it to the championship 4 again after winning at Martinsville. He ended up 2nd in the standings again. Smith moved to Front Row Motorsports No. 38 truck in 2022 and the 21 truck was shut down.

Truck No. 21 results

Truck No. 23 history

Spencer Gallagher (2014–2016)
The No. 23 truck ran part-time in 2014, with Spencer Gallagher (9 races) and Max Gresham (5 races). The team struggled in their first three races, with crashes at Martinsville and Kansas with Gallagher and a transmission failure with Gresham at Charlotte. They bounced back with an 11th at Kentucky with Gresham and top 15's at Iowa, Pocono, and Michigan with Gallagher. Gallagher earned a career best finish of third at Talladega in October.

In a 2014 interview with NASCAR.com, Spencer Gallagher stated that he planned to run full-time in the Truck Series in 2015, presumably in the No. 23. The No. 23 truck was announced as a full-time team with Gallagher in January 2015. He then finished 10th in the points standings.

Gallagher returned for 2016 with new crew chief Jeff Hensley. He earned two poles, with one top-five and eight top-10s to finish 12th in points.

Part-time (2017–2018)
In 2017 the No. 23 truck returned to the track, now part-time, with Spencer Gallagher and Chase Elliott driving. At Martinsville Elliott got the first win for the No. 23 truck. The No. 23 team decided to shut down for the remainder of the season and sold their owner points to Norm Benning Racing.

A year later, the No. 23 team returned with Timothy Peters driving at Martinsville, getting a top 10.

Brett Moffitt (2020)
On December 13, 2019, it was announced that Brett Moffitt would be driving the No. 23 full-time in 2020 with Chad Norris as his crew chief. Although he had only one win, he advanced to the Championship 4. Moffitt was in the lead in the championship race at Phoenix Raceway, when a caution came out for Dawson Cram and he fell to 10th.

Chase Purdy (2021)
In 2021, Chase Purdy will drive the No. 23 full-time replacing Moffitt. On August 5, 2021, Purdy tested positive for COVID-19; as the result, A. J. Allmendinger Came in as the replacement.

Grant Enfinger (2022–present)
On October 1, 2021, it was announced that Grant Enfinger would be driving the No. 23 truck full-time in 2022 and 2023.

Enfinger began the 2022 season with a 29th place finish at Daytona. He scored three top-fives and seven top-10 finishes to make the playoffs. During the playoffs, Enfinger scored his first win of the season at Indianapolis Raceway Park.

Truck No. 23 results

Truck No. 24 history

Part-time (2016)
In 2016, GMS Racing fielded the No. 24 for Kyle Larson at Martinsville, with sponsorship from McDonald's. Clint Bowyer drove the No. 24 at Kansas with sponsorship from Georgia Boot, finishing 5th in his first truck start since 2014. Ben Kennedy drove the truck at Dover as part of his multi-race stint with the team, with Kaz Grala in the No. 33. Grala then drove the truck at Iowa in June, starting fourth and finishing 29th. Grant Enfinger also ran several races. On October 22, Enfinger won the Fred's 250 at Talladega Superspeedway for his first career win. Shane Lee drove the No. 24 at Texas with sponsorship from LeeBoy at Texas where he finished 16th. Grala ran seven races in the No. 24 out of his nine Truck Series starts, with a best finish of seventh at New Hampshire. Haley returned to this truck at Texas.

Justin Haley (2017–2018)
In December 2016, GMS announced that K&N Pro Series East champion Justin Haley would drive the No. 24 truck full-time in 2017, skipping Daytona and Atlanta due to age restrictions. Scott Lagasse Jr drove the truck at Daytona, and Alex Bowman drove at Atlanta. Haley finished 12th in points, collecting 3 top fives and 12 top tens.

Haley won his first Truck Series race at Gateway in 2018, holding off Todd Gilliland and teammate Johnny Sauter, qualifying for the 2018 Camping World Truck Series Playoffs.

He won his way into the Round of 6 at Canadian Tire Motorsport Park, after Kyle Busch Motorsports teammates Noah Gragson and Todd Gilliland collided in the final corner. Haley then qualified for the Final 4 race with a win at Texas Motor Speedway, after Gilliland ran out of fuel on the final lap.

Brett Moffitt (2019)
On January 10, 2019, GMS Racing announced that 2018 NASCAR Camping World Truck Series champion Brett Moffitt will be in the No. 24 team. Moffitt won his first race with GMS at Iowa after Ross Chastain was disqualified when his truck failed the post-race inspection. He then took an unsponsored truck to victory lane at Chicagoland. Moffitt scored the first playoff win at Bristol, as well as winning the week after at Canadian Tire Motorsport Park.

Multiple drivers (2020–2021)
On October 25, 2019, it was announced that the No. 24 truck would be driven by Sam Mayer for 5 races and on January 10, 2020, it was announced that Mayer would share the ride with World of Outlaws driver David Gravel, who would drive it for 6 races with Eldora being the only one confirmed at this time. Chase Elliott was also later announced to run races with the team, driving at Charlotte, Atlanta, and Homestead. Chase Purdy was scheduled to drive  the No. 24 at Pocono Raceway, Kentucky Speedway, both Kansas Speedway events, Las Vegas Motor Speedway, Talladega Superspeedway, and Texas Motor Speedway. Haley returned to the No. 24 truck at Texas. Kris Wright drove the truck at the Daytona International Speedway road course. Greg Biffle would make one-off start in the No. 24 at Darlington.

On January 7, 2021, it was announced that the No. 24 truck would be driven by Raphaël Lessard for the full season. On April 3, 2021, it was announced that Lessard will no longer run for GMS Racing due to a lack of sponsorship. Ryan Reed drove at Darlington, Jack Wood drove at Circuit of the Americas and Charlotte, and Chase Elliott returned to the team in Texas. On June 10, 2021, it was announced that Wood would pilot the 24 truck for the remainder of the 2021 season. Six-time Whelen Modified Tour champions Doug Coby made one-off start at Bristol.

Jack Wood (2021–2022)
After he drove the No. 24 truck for 12 races in 2021, it was announced that Jack Wood will drive the truck full-time in 2022.

Rajah Caruth (2023–Present)
On December 6, 2022, GMS announced that Rajah Caruth would replace Wood for the 2023 season.

Truck No. 24 results

Truck No. 25 history
Dalton Sargeant (2018)
On January 12, 2018, Dalton Sargeant was announced to drive the No. 33 now renumbered to the No. 25. However, Sargeant was released due to sponsorship issues before Mosport. Spencer Gallagher was initially announced as a replacement driver; However, Gallagher sustained a shoulder injury and was replaced by Timothy Peters. Peters would get his 11th Truck Series win at Talladega.

On September 26, 2018, it was announced Tyler Dippel would drive the last 4 races of the 2018 season.

Truck No. 25 results

Truck No. 26 history

Tyler Ankrum (2020–2021)
On November 19, 2019, it was announced that 2019 Rookie of the Year Tyler Ankrum would move over to GMS Racing to drive a third full-time truck, which would later be revealed as the No. 26. On February 21, 2020, the No. 26 team was docked 10 owner and driver points prior to the Las Vegas race after an illegal engine oil reservoir tank was discovered during pre-race inspection.

Ankrum remained in the No. 26 for the 2021 NASCAR Camping World Truck Series. He finished the 2021 season with only 5 top-10s and 1 pole. Ankrum moved to Hattori Racing Enterprises No. 16 truck in 2022 and the 26 truck was shut down.

Truck No. 26 results

Truck No. 33 history

Brandon Jones (2014–2015)
In October 2014, it was announced that 17-year-old K&N Pro Series East driver Brandon Jones, crew chief Shane Huffman and the No. 33 Truck team would move from Turner Scott Motorsports (undergoing internal turmoil) to GMS for the final two races of their partial schedule at Martinsville and Phoenix.

Jones returned to the No. 33 truck for 17 races in 2015, while Richard Childress Racing teammates Austin and Ty Dillon ran the remaining six races with sponsorship from Rheem. Austin Dillon won the New Hampshire race to pick up GMS Racing's first Truck Series win.

Multiple drivers (2016)
Grant Enfinger was promoted from the ARCA Racing Series from GMS Racing, to drive part-time in the No. 33 Chevrolet Silverado for the team in 2016. 17-year old Kaz Grala drove the No. 33 in select races, beginning at Martinsville. On April 25, 2016, it was announced that Ben Kennedy would drive the No. 33 for 10 races, starting at Kansas. Kennedy scored his first career win at Bristol Motor Speedway in August, which clinched a chase spot for the championship. Kennedy would be eliminated Round of 8, after Phoenix and would finish 7th in points.

Kaz Grala (2017)
On December 5, 2016, it was announced that Kaz Grala would drive the No. 33 truck full-time next season with new crew chief Jerry Baxter who previously was a crew chief with Kyle Busch Motorsports.

On February 24, 2017, Kaz Grala won his inaugural race in the No. 33 truck at Daytona International Speedway after clearing a last-lap wreck in the NextEra Energy Resources 250.

Truck No. 33 results

Truck No. 43 history
Daniel Dye (2023-)
On October 25, 2022, it was announced that Daniel Dye would race for GMS full time in 2023 in a brand new No. 43 entry.

Truck No. 43 results

ARCA Menards Series

Car No. 20 history
The 20 car ran two ARCA Menards Series events in 2014. The first was with Spencer Gallagher at Daytona, replacing Scott Sheldon after Gallagher's No. 23 car was disqualified. Sheldon then ran the car at Talladega, finishing 13th.

In 2015, Scott Sheldon ran the 20 car at Daytona International Speedway and Talladega Superspeedway. Following this event the team shut down.

Car No. 21 history

For 2019 GMS returned to ARCA to run 15-year-old Sam Mayer in a part-time schedule. Mayer also ran the full season in the K&N Pro Series East with the team, and won the series championship.

In 2020, Mayer returned for another part-time schedule. He won 5 times and finished 7th in the standings.

In 2021, Jack Wood drove for the No. 21 car for 6 races. Daniel Dye also drove it for 6 races. He won once at Berlin Raceway, scoring his first-ever ARCA Menards Series win in just his second-ever start in the series. Kody Swanson made one start in the No. 21 car at Salem Speedway.

In 2022, Wood returned for one race at Mid-Ohio in the 21 car. This time the car was prepared by Bill McAnally Racing and it was a Toyota instead of the usual Chevy.

Car No. 22 history
In 2021, GMS fields the No. 22 for Jack Wood in a one-off at Bristol.

Car No. 23 history

Spencer Gallagher (2011–2014)
Spencer Gallagher ran 3 races in 2011 in a car numbered 05, with a best finish of 15th. Gallagher ran the full 19-race schedule in 2012, scoring 6 top tens and finishing 7th in points. Gallagher's numbers improved in 2013, scoring five top 5s and eight top 10s, but missing two races to finish 10th in points. Josh Williams replaced Gallagher at Winchester Speedway.

Gallagher returned for 2014, sponsored by Allegiant and Alamo Rent a Car. In October 2014 he got his first win in the 20th and final race of the ARCA season, the ARCA 98.9 at Kansas Speedway. Gallagher started 32nd and led the final 32 laps of the race.

Grant Enfinger (2015)
For 2015, Grant Enfinger moved over from the 90 car to the 23 for the full season, sponsorship pending. Enfinger had worked in the GMS shop during the off-season. Enfinger won the season opener at Daytona International Speedway, his second consecutive victory at the track. Enfinger won a total of six races en route to winning the championship.

Bret Holmes Racing (2016–present)
Following 2015, the equipment of the No. 23 team was sold to Bret Holmes Racing, with Enfinger serving as crew chief and part-time driver, and the effort supported by GMS. Enfinger scored a victory at Pocono in 2016 in the car.

Car No. 43 history
For 2022, GMS announced that Daniel Dye would drive the No. 21 car full-time in the main ARCA Series. However, after GMS merged with Richard Petty Motorsports, Dye moved to the new No. 43 car.

Car No. 90 history
Prior to the race at Lucas Oil Raceway in July, it was announced that four-time winner in 2014, Grant Enfinger, who was second in points at the time, would be moving from the Team BCR Ford to GMS Racing, taking his No. 90 and sponsor Motor Honey with him. GMS partner Allegiant Travel provided additional sponsorship. Enfinger finished 4th in his first race for GMS, but crashed at Pocono with Frank Kimmel. The next race at Berlin Raceway, Enfinger dominated, leading 181 of 200 laps to win the Federated Auto Parts 200 and moved within 25 points of the points leader Mason Mitchell. Enfinger scored his sixth win of the season at the DuQuoin State Fairgrounds Racetrack in September, leading 63 of 100 laps, and earning him the Bill France Four Crown award for the season. He would ultimately finish second to Mason Mitchell (who only had one win) after two DNFs in the final two races of the season. The team would shut down following the 2020 season.

ARCA Menards Series East

Car No. 21 history
For 2019 Sam Mayer ran the full K&N Pro Series East season in the No. 21 car, and won the series championship.

In 2020, Mayer returned for another full season in the rebranded ARCA Menards Series East. He won 5 out of 6 races and another championship.

In 2021, Jack Wood was scheduled to run full season at ARCA East, however, he only raced once, which was at the season opener at New Smyrna Speedway. Conner Jones made one start at Fairgrounds Speedway. Daniel Dye drove the No. 21 car for the last 4 races in the scheduled. The 21 would be replaced by the 43 for the 2022 season.

Car No. 22 history
In 2021, GMS fielded the No. 22 car for Jack Wood in a one-off at season finale at Bristol.

Car No. 43 history
In 2022, GMS fielded the No. 43 car for Daniel Dye at Iowa, Milwaukee, and Bristol.

ARCA Menards Series West

Car No. 21 history
In 2019, GMS fielded the No. 21 car  at K&N Pro Series West season finale at Phoenix for Sam Mayer. He won the pole and finished 2nd.

In 2020, Mayer returned to the rebranded ARCA Menards Series West for 2 races, for one of which, at Las Vegas Motor Speedway, he won.

In 2021, Jack Wood drove the No. 21 car at Phoenix.

In 2022, Wood returned for one race at Sonoma. This time the car was prepared by Bill McAnally Racing and was a Toyota instead of its usual Chevy.

Car No. 22 history
In 2021, GMS fielded the No. 22 car for Daniel Dye at the season finale at Phoenix and would shut down following the same event.

Car No. 43 history
In 2022, GMS fielded the No. 43 car for Daniel Dye at Phoenix. The No. 43 car make a return later in the season at Portland also driven by Dye. This time the car was prepared by Bill McAnally Racing.

References

External links

 

American auto racing teams
NASCAR teams
ARCA Menards Series teams
Auto racing teams established in 2011
Companies based in Charlotte, North Carolina
2011 establishments in North Carolina